is an arcade video game released in 1989 by Taito. The player moves a ball through a maze by rotating the maze itself around the ball. It was ported to the FM Towns, Super Nintendo Entertainment System, and X68000. The Super NES version was published in North America and Europe as On The Ball.

Release 

The game runs on Taito's F1 system hardware and uses the same optical rotary system from in Taito's 1986 arcade game Arkanoid. It was ported in 1992 to the Super NES, and in 1993 to the FM Towns computer. The Super NES release was titled On The Ball in North America and Europe, and was compatible with the Super NES Mouse.

Reception 
In Japan, Game Machine listed Cameltry on their May 15, 1990 issue as being the eleventh most-successful table arcade unit of the month.

Legacy
In 2006, Taito released an updated version for the Nintendo DS in Japan called Mawashite Koron, which made its way to North America and Europe in 2007 under the name Labyrinth. A version of the game is also available for the PlayStation 2, Xbox and Microsoft Windows, as part of the Taito Legends 2 collection, and for the PlayStation Portable, as part of the Taito Legends Power-Up collection with the remake version was included in the latter. Another updated version was released for the iPhone OS in 2009 and Zune HD in 2010.

References

External links 
 
 Cameltry at everything2
 
 "Mawashite Koron" at IGN

1989 video games
Arcade video games
FM Towns games
Marble games
Maze games
X68000 games
Super Nintendo Entertainment System games
IOS games
Video games scored by Hisayoshi Ogura
Video games scored by Yasuhisa Watanabe
Taito arcade games
Video games developed in Japan